Gyrd Løfqvist (2 June 1921 – 1 May 2012) was a Danish film actor. He appeared in more than sixty films from 1945 to 2006. Löfqvist came from a Norwegian-Swedish family living in Denmark. His mother was Norwegian, which gave him the Norwegian first name Oluf Gyrd, and from his father he had the Swedish last name Löfquist.

Filmography

References

External links
 

1921 births
2012 deaths
Danish male film actors
Male actors from Copenhagen